Flexible solar cell research is a research-level technology, an example of which was created at the Massachusetts Institute of Technology in which solar cells are manufactured by depositing photovoltaic material on flexible substrates, such as ordinary paper, using chemical vapor deposition technology. The technology for manufacturing solar cells on paper was developed by a group of researchers from the Massachusetts Institute of Technology with support from the National Science Foundation and the Eni-MIT Alliance Solar Frontiers Program.

Features
Circuits of organic photovoltaic materials are deposited in five layers on ordinary paper substrates in a vacuum chamber. It is done by coating conformal conductive polymer electrodes with oxidative chemical vapor, a process known as chemical vapor deposition. Such solar panels are capable of producing voltages exceeding than 50V, which in turn can power appliances at normal lighting conditions. The solar cell is also shown to be flexible. The solar cell conductive grid is similar to an inkjet photo printout with patterned rectangles. When leads are attached to the electrical substrate, it is shown to power electrical appliances. The cost of "printing" (as MIT describes it) is claimed to be similar to that of inkjet photo printing. This technology uses vapor deposition temperatures of less than 120°C, which makes it easier to manufacture on ordinary paper. The current efficiency of the panel is near 1%, which the researcher hopes to improve in the near future.

Testing
The circuit was also tested by depositing the photovoltaic materials on a polyethylene terephthalate (PET) substrate. The PET sheet was folded and unfolded 1000 times and no overt deterioration in performance was observed, whereas common photovoltaic materials deposited on PET deteriorated with just a single fold. The solar cell was also passed through a laser printer to demonstrate its continued performance after exposure to [somewhat] high temperatures and it still retained its characteristics after the procedure.

Advantages
In conventional solar panels, the supporting structures of the panel like glass, brackets etc. are mostly twice as costly as the photovoltaic materials manufactured on them. As paper costs approximately a thousandth of glass, solar cells using printing processes can be much cheaper than conventional solar panels. Also other methods involving coating papers with materials include first coating the paper with a smooth material to counter-act the molecular scale roughness of paper. But in this method, the photovoltaic material can be coated directly onto untreated paper.

Applications
If such solar cells can achieve sufficient technological maturity, they can be used as wall paper and window shades for producing electricity from room lighting. They can also be manufactured on clothing, which can in turn be used to charge portable electronic devices like mobile phones and media players.

Flexible solar modules can be used on curved roofs, or roofs where it does not make sense to install a rack mounting system.

Disadvantages
In order to last 20+ years outdoors exposed to the elements, such solar cells must be finished with a front sheet of a UV-resistant fluoropolymer or thermoplastic olefin rather than the glass used in conventional solar cells, which is comparatively inexpensive .  Solar cells must be sealed so water and oxygen cannot enter and destroy the cells via oxidative degradation.

See also

 Thin film solar cell
 Organic solar cell
 Sun-free photovoltaics
 Polarizing organic photovoltaics

References

External links
 Flexible Solar Panels: 5 Things You Must Need to Know Before Buying (2020 Update) by Link Solar

Solar cells